Ahn Sang-soo (born 28 May 1946) is a South Korean politician of the Saenuri Party who served as two-time mayor of Incheon from 2002 to 2010. In the 2010 local elections he lost his position to Song Young-gil of the Democratic Party. He was a candidate for the Saenuri nomination in the 2012 presidential elections. As mayor, Ahn was responsible for initiating a range of expensive construction projects which have been implicated in causing financial difficulties.

On November 22, 2019, while serving in the National Assembly representing the opposition Liberty Korea party, he introduced an amendment to remove homophobia and transphobia from a list of violations of an anti-discrimination law.
He used a poster that compared homosexual marriage to a picture of a woman marrying a dog.

References

|-

1946 births
Living people
Seoul National University alumni
Liberty Korea Party politicians
South Korean presidential candidates, 2012
Mayors of Incheon